Dr. Kamini A. Rao is a pioneer in the field of Assisted Reproduction in India. She has specialized in reproductive endocrinology, ovarian physiology and assisted reproductive technology and has been awarded the Padma Sri, one of India's highest civilian awards. Dr. Kamini A. Rao   is the medical director at Milann – Centre for Reproductive Medicine (A Unit of BACC Healthcare Pvt. Ltd.).

Life and career

Her early education was at Bishop Cotton Girls' High School, Bangalore and she started studying medicine in St. John's Medical College, Bangalore, and Vanivilas Bangalore. Dr. Kamini has been professionally trained in Fetal Invasive Therapy under Prof.  Kypros Nicolaides, Harris Birthright Research Centre for Fetal Medicine, King's College School of Medicine, London, U.K and has undergone Laser Surgery   training   in   South   Cleveland    Hospital, Middlesbrough, U.K.,   under Prof. Ray Garry.

Rao is credited with the birth of India's First SIFT Baby. She has the distinction of having set up South India ‘s first Semen Bank as well as having engineered South India's First Babies born through ICSI (Intra Cytoplasmic  Sperm Injection)  as well as through Laser Assisted Hatching.
 
Trained in the United Kingdom, she returned to India to set up the Reproductive Medicine Clinic, BACC Healthcare Pvt. Ltd. now known as Milann – Centre for Reproductive Medicine, a center that attracts patients not only from all over India but also from many other parts of the world like the U.K., U.S.A, South East Asia, Middle East as well as our neighboring countries.

Awards
Padma Shri Awards in 2014
Karnataka State Award (Rajyotsava Award) for invaluable service in the field of medicine.
Vidya Ratan Award for invaluable service in the field of medicine.
Lifetime Achievement Honours Tribute Award, for dedicated service to the Nation & Profession, from the Vivekananda Institute of Human Excellence, Hyderabad.
Aryabhatta Award from the Aryabhatta Cultural Organisation for excellence in the field of medicine.
B.C. Roy District Award from the Shimoga district unit of Indian Medical Association.
Lifetime Achievement Award from the Bangalore Society of Obstetrics & Gynecology
Lifetime Achievement Award from the Federation of Obstetric & Gynecological Societies of India
Elected fellowship of the National Academy of Medical Sciences

Publications
 Handbook of Obstetric Emergencies (2003) Japee Brothers Medical Publishers, 
 The Infertility Manual (2005) Anshan Publishers, co-authored by Peter R. Brinsden and A. Henry Sathananthan, 
 Textbook of Midwifery and Obstetrics for Nurses Elsevier India,  
 Endoscopy in Infertility (2007) Anshan Publishers, co-authored by Christopher Chen,  
 Recurrent Pregnancy Loss - ECAB (2009) Elsevier Health Sciences,

References

External links
 http://drkaminirao.com/
 Interview: Infertility— an occupational hazard?, The Hindu 17 December 2002

Recipients of the Padma Shri in medicine
Indian gynaecologists
1953 births
Living people
Fellows of the National Academy of Medical Sciences
Medical doctors from Bangalore
Indian endocrinologists
20th-century Indian medical doctors
Indian women gynaecologists
20th-century Indian women scientists
Women scientists from Karnataka
20th-century women physicians